The 2022–23 Melbourne United season was the 40th season of the franchise in the National Basketball League (NBL), and their 9th under the banner of Melbourne United.

Roster

Standings

Ladder 

The NBL tie-breaker system as outlined in the NBL Rules and Regulations states that in the case of an identical win–loss record, the overall points percentage will determine order of seeding.

Ladder progression

Game log

Pre-season 

|-style="background:#FFBBBB;"
| 1
| 9 August
| Saint Mary's
| L 67–88
| Shea Ili (18)
| Brad Newley (5)
| Joshua Duach (3)
| Keilor Stadium1,000
| 0–1

|-style="background:#FFBBBB;"
| 2
| 8 September
| Brisbane
| L 77–105
| Rayjon Tucker (20)
| Rayjon Tucker (8)
| Xavier Rathan-Mayes (4)
| Selkirk Stadium2,000
| 0–2
|-style="background:#FFBBBB;"
| 3
| 10 September
| Brisbane
| L 72–76
| Rayjon Tucker (28)
| Rayjon Tucker (9)
| Brad Newley (2)
| Casey Stadium1,100
| 0–3

NBL Blitz 

|-style="background:#FFBBBB;"
| 1
| 18 September
| @ Illawarra
| L 81–68
| Rayjon Tucker (20)
| Ariel Hukporti (8)
| Rayjon Tucker (3)
| Darwin Basketball Facility922
| 0–1
|-style="background:#BBF3BB;"
| 2
| 21 September
| Perth
| W 90–63
| Xavier Rathan-Mayes (22)
| Jordan Caroline (14)
| Caroline, Humphries, Tucker (3)
| Darwin Basketball Facility917
| 1–1
|-style="background:#BBF3BB;"
| 3
| 23 September
| Brisbane
| W 80–67
| Chris Goulding (19)
| Rayjon Tucker (8)
| Xavier Rathan-Mayes (4)
| Darwin Basketball Facility906
| 2–1

Regular season 

|-style="background:#BBF3BB;"
| 1
| 2 October
| New Zealand
| W 101–97 (OT)
| Xavier Rathan-Mayes (33)
| Isaac Humphries (6)
| Xavier Rathan-Mayes (9)
| John Cain Arena7,236
| 1–0
|-style="background:#FFBBBB;"
| 2
| 9 October
| Sydney
| L 71–91
| Barker, Caroline (10)
| Jordan Caroline (10)
| Rayjon Tucker (3)
| John Cain Arena7,881
| 1–1
|-style="background:#BBF3BB;"
| 3
| 14 October
| @ Perth
| W 81–84
| Humphries, Rathan-Mayes (17)
| Xavier Rathan-Mayes (11)
| Goulding, Rathan-Mayes (5)
| RAC Arena10,441
| 2–1
|-style="background:#FFBBBB;"
| 4
| 16 October
| Tasmania
| L 64–74
| Xavier Rathan-Mayes (18)
| Barlow, Rathan-Mayes (7)
| David Barlow (4)
| John Cain Arena7,292
| 2–2
|-style="background:#FFBBBB;"
| 5
| 20 October
| Cairns
| L 77–81
| Xavier Rathan-Mayes (21)
| Rayjon Tucker (10)
| Goulding, Rathan-Mayes (3)
| John Cain Arena4,449
| 2–3
|-style="background:#FFBBBB;"
| 6
| 23 October
| Sydney
| L 69–87
| Rayjon Tucker (20)
| Rayjon Tucker (10)
| Xavier Rathan-Mayes (7)
| John Cain Arena10,300
| 2–4
|-style="background:#BBF3BB;"
| 7
| 29 October
| @ Illawarra
| W 100–106 (2OT)
| Xavier Rathan-Mayes (32)
| Rayjon Tucker (13)
| Chris Goulding (5)
| WIN Entertainment Centre3,139
| 3–4
|-style="background:#BBF3BB;"
| 8
| 31 October
| Perth
| W 94–77
| Xavier Rathan-Mayes (25)
| Xavier Rathan-Mayes (10)
| Chris Goulding (5)
| John Cain Arena6,610
| 4–4

|-style="background:#FFBBBB;"
| 9
| 4 November 
| @ Cairns
| L 97–72
| Isaac Humphries (17)
| Isaac Humphries (8)
| Goulding, Newley (4)
| Cairns Convention Centre3,704
| 4–5
|-style="background:#BBF3BB;"
| 10
| 6 November 
| S.E. Melbourne
| W 110–85
| Chris Goulding (30)
| Xavier Rathan-Mayes (6)
| Xavier Rathan-Mayes (8)
| John Cain Arena10,300
| 5–5
|-style="background:#FFBBBB;"
| 11
| 17 November 
| Adelaide
| L 86–91
| Rayjon Tucker (23)
| Isaac Humphries (6)
| Isaac Humphries (4)
| John Cain Arena5,100
| 5–6
|-style="background:#FFBBBB;"
| 12
| 19 November 
| @ S.E. Melbourne
| L 84–69
| Rayjon Tucker (22)
| Xavier Rathan-Mayes (8)
| Xavier Rathan-Mayes (7)
| John Cain Arena10,175
| 5–7
|-style="background:#FFBBBB;"
| 13
| 26 November 
| Tasmania
| L 90–94
| Rayjon Tucker (23)
| Rayjon Tucker (10)
| Xavier Rathan-Mayes (6)
| John Cain Arena6,263
| 5–8

|-style="background:#FFBBBB;"
| 14
| 3 December 
| @ S.E. Melbourne
| L 78–72
| Xavier Rathan-Mayes (15)
| Mason Peatling (11)
| Xavier Rathan-Mayes (7)
| John Cain Arena5,651
| 5–9
|-style="background:#FFBBBB;"
| 15
| 5 December 
| @ Illawarra
| L 93–79
| Rayjon Tucker (27)
| Marcus Lee (6)
| Goulding, Okwera, Rathan-Mayes (3)
| WIN Entertainment Centre2,248
| 5–10
|-style="background:#BBF3BB;"
| 16
| 10 December 
| Brisbane 
| W 104–88
| Goulding, Tucker (20)
| Isaac Humphries (7)
| Xavier Rathan-Mayes (10)
| John Cain Arena5,788
| 6–10
|-style="background:#FFBBBB;"
| 17
| 12 December 
| @ Perth
| L 90–89
| Xavier Rathan-Mayes (22)
| Humphries, Lee, Tucker (8)
| Ili, Peatling, Rathan-Mayes, Tucker (3)
| RAC Arena10,459
| 6–11
|-style="background:#BBF3BB;"
| 18
| 15 December 
| S.E. Melbourne
| W 92–76
| Rayjon Tucker (33)
| Xavier Rathan-Mayes (9)
| Xavier Rathan-Mayes (5)
| John Cain Arena6,228
| 7–11
|-style="background:#BBF3BB;"
| 19
| 18 December 
| Illawarra
| W 88–77
| Chris Goulding (25)
| Mason Peatling (11)
| Shea Ili (7)
| John Cain Arena6,806
| 8–11
|-style="background:#BBF3BB;"
| 20
| 23 December 
| Cairns
| W 84–81
| Rayjon Tucker (27)
| Marcus Lee (10)
| Peatling, Rathan-Mayes (4)
| John Cain Arena10,175
| 9–11
|-style="background:#FFBBBB;"
| 21
| 25 December 
| @ Sydney
| L 101–80
| Rayjon Tucker (31)
| David Okwera (12)
| Shea Ili (7)
| Qudos Bank Arena7,012
| 9–12

|-style="background:#BBF3BB;"
| 22
| 1 January 
| @ Brisbane
| W 86–99
| Goulding, Tucker (20)
| Isaac Humphries (9)
| Xavier Rathan-Mayes (6)
| Nissan Arena4,781
| 10–12
|-style="background:#BBF3BB;"
| 23
| 7 January 
| @ Tasmania 
| W 85–92
| Chris Goulding (23)
| Marcus Lee (10)
| Shea Ili (8)
| MyState Bank Arena4,269
| 11–12
|-style="background:#BBF3BB;"
| 24
| 12 January 
| @ New Zealand
| W 65–77
| Xavier Rathan-Mayes (20)
| Marcus Lee (9)
| Marcus Lee (5)
| Christchurch Arena5,217
| 12–12
|-style="background:#BBF3BB;"
| 25
| 14 January 
| @ Brisbane 
| W 91–101
| Rayjon Tucker (30)
| Marcus Lee (6)
| Shea Ili (7)
| Nissan Arena4,703
| 13–12
|-style="background:#BBF3BB;"
| 26
| 21 January 
| @ Adelaide 
| W 87–94
| Chris Goulding (28)
| Rayjon Tucker (10)
| Shea Ili (5)
| Adelaide Entertainment Centre9,505
| 14–12
|-style="background:#FFBBBB;"
| 27
| 28 January 
| @ New Zealand
| L 80–74
| Xavier Rathan-Mayes (15)
| Lee, Rathan-Mayes (7)
| Marcus Lee (3)
| Spark Arena6,488
| 14–13

|-style="background:#BBF3BB;"
| 28
| 5 February 
| Adelaide
| W 116–107
| Rayjon Tucker (31)
| Humphries, Lee (9)
| Rathan-Mayes, Tucker (5)
| John Cain Arena10,175
| 15–13

Transactions

Re-signed

Additions

Subtractions

Awards

Club awards 
 SHARE Award: Callum Dalton
 Defensive Player: Marcus Lee
 Vince Crivelli Club Person of the Year: Nicola Parkinson
 Club MVP: Chris Goulding

See also 
 2022–23 NBL season
 Melbourne United

References

External links 

 Official Website

Melbourne United
Melbourne United seasons
Melbourne United season